Mike Norseth (born August 22, 1964) is a former American football quarterback. He played for the Cincinnati Bengals in 1988 and for the Birmingham Fire in 1992.

References

1964 births
Living people
American football quarterbacks
Kansas Jayhawks football players
Cincinnati Bengals players
Birmingham Fire players